David Guy Westcott (born 14 May 1957 in London) is a former field hockey player, who won the bronze medal with the British squad at the 1984 Summer Olympics in Los Angeles. Westcott also played cricket. He had studied at Brasenose College, Oxford.

David Westcott is a retired barrister specialising in personal injury and clinical negligence. He was appointed as one of Her Majesty's Queen's Counsel in 2003. He is a member of Outer Temple Chambers..

References

External links
 
 David Westcott profile
 

1957 births
Living people
People educated at Cranleigh School
Alumni of Brasenose College, Oxford
English cricketers
English male field hockey players
Olympic field hockey players of Great Britain
Field hockey players at the 1984 Summer Olympics
Sportspeople from London
Olympic medalists in field hockey
Medalists at the 1984 Summer Olympics
Olympic bronze medallists for Great Britain
Southgate Hockey Club players